The St. Louis Cardinals, a professional baseball franchise based in St. Louis, Missouri, compete in the National League (NL) of Major League Baseball (MLB).

Owners, transactions and valuation

Chris von der Ahe (1882–1898)

Chris von der Ahe was the first owner of the Cardinals franchise, then known as the Brown Stockings and pioneered many of the elements commonly associated with the sport at the game. A German immigrant who made his way as a grocer and saloon owner, he saw potential in the sport without otherwise having any other background in it. He also became a polarizing figure with his employees and rivals: Von der Ahe was a flamboyant and magnanimous entrepreneur who gained enormous popularity in St. Louis and his team but was reviled by rival owners. He was marked by a willingness to charge lower admission rates, encouraging play on Sundays, and opening beer concessions at the stadium, a practice that the National League prohibited during Von der Ahe's time. He also was one of the few owners to make a profit during his time, in contrast with his rival owners, whose American Association eventually collapsed due to bankruptcy.
 National League owners such Albert Spalding bristled at his promotional techniques that became common to today's game. Charlie O. Finley, Larry McPhail, and Bill Veeck eventually employed sideshow attractions, like the "stadium club" and the shoot-the-chute.

In 1881, after the Browns profited $25,000 from playing a season's worth of informal contests, Von der Ahe bought out the team's remaining stockholders for $1,800. With baseball's already existing popularity in Cincinnati and increasing popularity in other cities such as Pittsburgh, Philadelphia and Baltimore, the time was right for a new league. Late that same year, along with other owners and financiers, Von der Ahe formed the American Association of Base Ball Clubs with the Brown Stockings.
In 1899, von der Ahe, once the most successful owner in the AA, was forced to sell the Browns due to bankruptcy.

Sam Breadon (1920–1947)
First making his mark as a local automobile dealer, Sam Breadon first purchased a minority stake in the Cardinals in 1917 for $2,000, thus commencing 30 total years as owner of the Cardinals. Three years later, Breadon bought out the majority stock in the club to become the principal owner of the Cardinals and extinguished the futility that dredged the Cardinals' first three decades in the National League. Between 1926 and 1946, the Cardinals won six World Series titles and nine National League pennants.

Breadon was noted for a very conservative nature with his finances, highly demanding nature of his teams' success on the field, and bold moves otherwise. When he became minority owner, the Cardinals were $150,000 in debt. In 1925, he moved Branch Rickey from the dugout to the front office and promoted second baseman Rogers Hornsby to player-manager. Breadon also convinced cross-town American League rival St. Louis Browns owner Phil Ball to allow the Cardinals to move into Sportsman's Park. This allowed him to sell the dilapidated Robison Field property for a total of $275,000 to the city and a trolley company, clear their debts, and, with Rickey's oversight, establish an official, contractually-linked minor league farm system. This strategy developed into the current minor league system and the Cardinals used it to circumvent the practice of bidding against the more affluent Major League teams such as the New York Yankees and New York Giants for players from minor league teams, which at that time were unaffiliated. Although Minor League Baseball has existed as long as baseball has been organized, it was the first player development system of its kind in any professional sport.

Between 1920 and 1947, the Cardinals compiled a record of 2,470-1,830 for a winning percentage of .574. When he sold the Cardinals to Fred Saigh and Robert Hannegan in 1947, the price was $3 million, at the time the largest transaction in baseball history.

Fred Saigh (1947–1953)
At the end of the 1947 baseball season, Saigh got wind that longtime Cardinals owner Sam Breadon wanted to sell. Breadon faced two problems. He was ill with prostate cancer, and he had been unable to find land on which to build a planned new ballpark. The Cardinals had rented Sportsman's Park from the city's other major league team, the American League Browns, since 1920. Although they had long since surpassed the Browns as the city's most popular team, Breadon wanted to build a park of his own. He had set aside $5 million to build a park, and was facing the end of a five-year deadline to build it before having to pay taxes on that money. Saigh persuaded Breadon to sell the Cardinals to him, with the assurance that he wouldn't have to pay taxes on his $5 million fund. To further put him at ease, Saigh brought in Robert Hannegan as a minority partner. Hannegan was a prominent St. Louis businessman, former United States Postmaster General, and confidante of President Harry Truman. The $4 million deal closed in late 1947.

Saigh inherited a team in transition. The Cardinals, though then just one year removed from their ninth National League pennant and sixth World Series championship since 1926, had begun to decay as an organization. Five years before, Breadon had forced out legendary general manager Branch Rickey, who had quickly resurfaced with the Brooklyn Dodgers. Meanwhile, the Browns, under new owner Bill Veeck, began a concerted effort to drive the Cardinals out of town.

In January 1949, Hannegan, suffering from poor health, his share of the team to Saigh. Hannegan died that October of heart disease. As sole owner, Saigh's notable actions included leading other baseball owners to oust (by not renewing his contract) Commissioner of Baseball Happy Chandler in December, 1950  and proposing revenue-sharing of local television revenues.

However, the tax dodge Saigh used soon came to light, as well as other questionable practices on his part. Saigh was indicted on federal charges of evading $49,260 in income taxes between 1946 and 1949. In January 1953, he pleaded no contest to two counts involving more than $19,000 in tax underpayments, and was sentenced to 15 months in prison. He served five months at the federal penitentiary in Terre Haute, Indiana, leaving in November 1953 when he was given parole for good behavior.

In February 1953, under pressure from Commissioner Ford Frick, Saigh put the Cardinals up for sale. Saigh would have almost certainly been thrown out of baseball if he hadn't sold the team. For a time, no credible offers surfaced from St. Louis interests, making it seem likely that the team would be purchased by someone interested in moving them to another city. The most promising offer came from a consortium of businessmen in Houston, Texas. The Cardinals owned the Houston Buffaloes of the Texas League; under major-league rules of the time, that meant they also held the major-league rights to Houston. The only question was whether Buffalo Stadium could be upgraded to major-league standards.

However, just before he was due to reach a final agreement with the Houston group, Saigh sold the Cardinals to Anheuser-Busch, the St. Louis-based brewery. Although Anheuser-Busch's offer was far less ($3.75 million) than what out-of-town suitors had on the table, Anheuser-Busch president Gussie Busch persuaded Saigh that civic pride was more important than money. This all but assured that the Cardinals would stay in St. Louis. Shortly afterward, the Cardinals bought Sportsman's Park from the Browns. With their remaining leverage gone, it was the Browns who left town by the end of the season, becoming the Baltimore Orioles.

Anheuser-Busch (1953–1996)

DeWitt, Baur and Hanser (1996–present)

As with other periods of the Cardinals' transaction history, doubt loomed as to whether the purchaser would keep the team in St. Louis, due to the city's status as a "small market," which appear to handicap a club's competitiveness. Such was the case when Sam Breadon sold the Cardinals in 1947: then-NL President Ford Frick had proposed to Breadon the idea of moving the Cardinals to Chicago. When AB placed the Cardinals for sale in 1995, they publicly expressed intention to find a buyer who would keep the club in St. Louis. In March 1996, AB sold the team for $147 million to a partnership headed by Southwest Bank's Drew Baur, Hanser and DeWitt, Jr. Civic Center Redevelopment, a subsidiary of AB, held the parking garages and adjacent property and also transferred them to the Baur ownership group. Baur's group then sold the garages to another investment group, making the net cost of the franchise purchase about $100 million, making the net purchase price about $10 million less than Financial World's value of the team at the time $110 million.

Current Cincinnati Reds owner Bob Castellini and brothers Thomas Williams and W. Joseph Williams Jr. each once owned a stake in the Cardinals dating back to the Baur-DeWitt group's purchase of the team. To allow their purchase of the Reds in 2005, the rest of the group bought out Castellini's and the Williams brothers' shares, totaling an estimated 13%. At that time, the Forbes valued the Cardinals at about $370 million. However, after reabsorbing that stake into the remainder of the group, they decided to make it available to new investors in 2010. Amid later allegations that the Cardinals owed the city profit shares, DeWitt revealed that their profitability had not reached the threshold to trigger that obligation.

Recent annual financial records
As of 2013, according to Forbes, the Cardinals are the tenth-most valuable franchise of 30 in MLB at $716.2 million, with a revenue of $239 million. They play "in the best single-team baseball market in the country and are among the league's leaders in television ratings and attendance every season." Concurrent with the growth of Major League Baseball, the Cardinals value has increased significantly since the Baur-DeWitt purchase. In 2000, the franchise was valued at $219 million, a growth rate of 327%. Since 2012, the franchise's value grew 21%.

{| cellpadding="1" style="width:750px; font-size:90%; border:2px solid #0a2252;"
|- style="text-align:center; font-size:larger;"
| colspan=5 | St. Louis Cardinals' financial value since 2009|- style="background:#C41E3A;color:white;"
| Year|| $ Franchise Value (mil.) 1 || $ Revenue (mil.) 2 || $ Operating Income (mil.) 3 || $ Player Expenses (mil.) 4 || Wins-to-player cost ratio 5

|-
| 2009
| $486
| $195
| $   7
| $120
|   87
|-
| 2010
| $488
| $195
| $12.8
| $111
| 100
|-
| 2011
| $518
| $207
| $19.8
| $110
|   94
|-
| 2012 TV Money Is A Game Changer For Baseball and The Dodgers (Apr. 9 issue of Forbes)
| $591
| $233
| $25.0
| $123
| 116
|-
| 2013 Baseball Team Valuations 2013: Yankees On Top At $2.3 Billion, Forbes (Mar. 27, 2013)
| $716
| $239
| $19.9
| $134
| 102
|}

Valuation per Forbes.
1 Based on current stadium deal (unless new stadium is pending) without deduction for debt, other than stadium debt.      (2013: Market $291 mil., Stadium $182 mil., Sport $151 mil., Brand Management $91 mil.)      (2012: Market $240 mil., Stadium $157 mil., Sport $119 mil., Brand Management $78 mil.)
     (2011: Market $206 mil., Stadium $136 mil., Sport $111 mil., Brand Management $65 mil.)

2 Net of stadium revenues used for debt payments. 
3 Earnings before interest, taxes, depreciation and amortization. 
4 Includes benefits and bonuses. 
5 Compares the number of wins per player payroll relative to the rest of MLB. Playoff wins count twice as much as regular season wins. A score of 120 means that the team achieved 20% more victories per dollar of payroll compared with the league average in 2010.

Principal ownersNote:' β'' – Breadon was co-owner from 1917 to 1920 with no majority team owners in that time, but in 1920 bought out all ownership stakes and remained sole owner until 1947, when he sold the team to Saigh and Hannegan.

Presidents
The president typically reports direct to the owner in the case where the two positions were not held by the same person.

General managers
A total of 14 general managers (GM) have served for the Cardinals.  Branch Rickey was the Cardinals first official GM — however, his role initially called for him to function more as a business manager — as he pioneered certain functions attributed to the contemporary GM, such as developing the forerunner of the minor league farm system that all Major League Baseball franchises use today. Rickey is also the longest tenured GM in franchise history with 23 years. Notable Cardinals who have served as GM but gained their notoriety through other roles while with the Cardinals include former outfielder Stan Musial and manager Whitey Herzog. Rickey, William Walsingham, Jr., Musial, Joe McDonald, Walt Jocketty and Mozeliak each won at least one World Series as Cardinals GM. Rickey won the most with four. Hall of Fame inductees who have served as GM for the Cardinals include Herzog, Musial and Rickey.

Other executives

Prior executives
Sheldon "Chief" Bender
Bob Gebhard
Marty Hendin
Fred Koenig
Fred McAlister
Joe McDonald
George Silvey
Lee Thomas, Director of player personnel (1980–1988)
Dick Wagner
Jerry Walker

Other current team executives
Randy Flores, Scouting director
Moíses Rodríguez, Director of international operations
Mike Jorgensen, Special assistant to the general manager
Willie McGee, Special assistant to the general manager
Matt Slater, Director of Player Personnel

Related lists
 List of St. Louis Cardinals managers
 List of St. Louis Cardinals coaches
 List of St. Louis Cardinals seasons

References

Further reading

External links
Baseball America: Executive Database

St. Louis
 
 
Owners and executives